The Homilies d'Organyà constitute one of the oldest known literary documents (longer than a mere fragment) in the Catalan language. It is known for the antiquity of its language, between vulgar Latin and Catalan. Older texts in Catalan include a fragment of the Forum iudicum, the feudal oath of 1098, and the Greuges de Guitard Isarn of 1080–1091, also of Organyà origin, as well as Catalan glosses in Latin documents dated to as far back as 1034.

The Homilies d'Organyà were discovered in the vicarage of Organyà in 1904 by Dr. Joaquim Miret i Sans, a historian and lawyer. It is dated to the end of the 12th century and is composed of six sermons that include commentaries on various gospels and epistles.

The original is kept in the National Library of Catalonia, and a reproduction is also displayed in Organyà.

Origin 
The homilies discovered in Organyà are related to others that were found in Tortosa at the end of the 19th century by Antoine Thomas. Both have a common homily—that of Ash Wednesday—which has linked them to collections of homilies of Provençal origin, which were in frequent use in that era. While the Tortosa homilies copy the Provençal text and have a popular tone, those of Organyà are translations into Catalan and have a more cultivated tone.

Level of linguistic development 
Interference from Provençal is seen in orthographic, phonetic and morphological archaisms, owing to the close political, economic and cultural relations between the Occitan territories and the Catalan counties.

See also
Old Catalan

References

External links 
 Consulta de la digitalización de las homilías de Organyà

12th-century Christian texts
Medieval Catalan literature
Christian sermons